The Bluestone Boys is a 1976 Australian comedy television series about a fictional prison, produced by Crawford Productions. The program was not particularly successful and was cancelled after a run of 26 episodes. The series starred Garry Meadows and Chuck Faulkner.

References

External links

The Bluestone Boys at AustLit

Network 10 original programming
Australian comedy television series
Australian prison television series
1976 Australian television series debuts
Television series by Crawford Productions
1970s prison television series